LVIII Panzer Corps was a panzer corps in the German Army during World War II.

This corps was established on 28 July 1943 as LVIII. Reserve-Panzerkorps in Wehrkreis V. On 6 July 1944, it was renamed LVIII Panzerkorps. 

It was sent to Le Mans in France on 20 July 1944 to fight the allies. It retreated through France before fighting in the Ardennes Offensive in winter 1944-1945. It ended the war in the Ruhr Pocket in April 1945.

Commanders
 General der Panzertruppen Leo Freiherr Geyr von Schweppenburg - From 28 July 1943 to 30 November 1943
 General der Panzertruppe Hans-Karl Freiherr von Esebeck - From 1 December 1943 to 10 February 1944
 General der Panzertruppe Walter Krüger - From 10 February 1944 to 25 March 1945
 Generalleutnant Walter Botsch - From 25 March 1944 to April 1945

Area of operations
 France : July 1944 - December 1944
 Ardennes : December 1944
 Western Germany : January 1945 - April 1945

Sources
 LVIII. Panzerkorps on lexikon-der-wehrmacht.de

P058
Military units and formations established in 1943
Military units and formations disestablished in 1945